The Challenge de Catalunya was a golf tournament on the Challenge Tour.

The first edition was played at the Golf La Graiera, Calafell in Tarragona, Catalonia, Spain. 

The second edition was in 2014 at the Lumine Golf & Beach Club.

Winners

Notes

References

External links
Coverage on the Challenge Tour's official site

Former Challenge Tour events
Golf tournaments in Catalonia